The Metro Rail Transit Line 8, or MRT-8, also known as PNR East-West Line, is a proposed rapid transit line in the Philippines. It would be a  railway system connecting Sampaloc, Manila and Diliman, Quezon City via Commonwealth Avenue, Quezon Avenue, and España Boulevard.

The railway line was formerly designated as MRT-9, which has since been designated to the Metro Manila Subway)

Background
The right-of-way of Line 8 can be traced to the original MRT Line 4 proposal in the late 20th century. In 1999, the former Line 4 was to be located between Recto Avenue in Manila and Batasan Hills in Quezon City. The proposed line was eventually renumbered as Line 8, with Line 4 redefined as the monorail alignment between Pasig and Taytay, Rizal after its approval in 2019.

An unsolicited proposal for the project was submitted to the Philippine government by Malaysia-based construction engineering company AlloyMTD group in 2016, and is awaiting approval by the National Economic Development Authority (NEDA). According to MTD Philippines, Inc. President Patrick Nicholas David, the project would cost ₱60 billion.

It was then announced in 2020 that the line will undergo detailed design phase starting 2021. Construction would then commence the following year and the line shall open by 2027.

A private company named Private Equity Investments and Development Corporation reported on its website on June 3, 2021 that the East West Rail Transit Corporation has sought French manufacturer Alstom to be one of its partners. They are expected to be involved in the project as an electromechanical supplier.

Another proposal, from the MRT-7, as part of its future expansion, will tread the same path with the exception of starting from West Avenue onwards towards Pier 4, instead of Quiapo. Like with the MRT-8, this proposed expansion from the MRT-7 are still pending approvals.

Stations 
Line 8 would have 11 stations, all located in Quezon City or Manila.

Rolling stock
According to a November 12, 2020 meeting with barangay captains of Manila, the line will use 4-car trainsets. Due to a 2016 National Economic and Development Authority (NEDA) directive, all conventional rail lines including Line 8 will use standard-gauge track.

References

Rail transportation in Metro Manila
Proposed public transportation in the Philippines